Santa Ana del Yacuma Airport  is an airport serving the town of Santa Ana del Yacuma in the Beni Department of Bolivia. The runway is just south of the town.

The Santa Ana non-directional beacon (Ident: ANA) is located on the field.

Airlines and destinations

See also

Transport in Bolivia
List of airports in Bolivia

References

External links
OpenStreetMap - Santa Ana
OurAirports - Santa Ana
SkyVector - Santa Ana Airport
Fallingrain - Santa Ana del Yacuma Airport

Airports in Beni Department